Haicang may refer to: 

 Haicang District (海沧区), in the municipal region of Xiamen, Fujian, China 
 Haicang Town (海沧镇), in Haicang District, Xiamen, Fujian, China